is the name of several mountains in Japan. An incomplete list of the mountains is included below.
 Mount Chitose (Kamikawa), in Hokkaidō Prefecture
 Mount Chitose (Yamagata), in Yamagata Prefecture
 Mount Chitose (Kyoto), in Kyoto Prefecture
 Mount Chitose (Okinawa), in Senkaku Islands, Okinawa Prefecture